The Shipping News is a 2001 Canadian-Swedish-American drama film directed by Lasse Hallström, based on Annie Proulx's Pulitzer Prize-winning book of the same title.

It stars Kevin Spacey as Quoyle, Judi Dench as Agnis Hamm, and Julianne Moore as Wavey Prowse. Cate Blanchett, Pete Postlethwaite, Scott Glenn, Rhys Ifans, Jason Behr, and Gordon Pinsent appear in supporting roles.

Plot
When Quoyle was a young boy, his father, Guy, tossed him into a lake, expecting him to swim naturally. Images of flailing in water and nearly drowning often resurface in Quoyle's memory when he is under stress.

Quoyle, now an ink setter at a small newspaper in Poughkeepsie, New York, lives a lonely life. He becomes infatuated with and marries a vivacious local woman named Petal. Petal is an unfaithful wife and a negligent mother to their six-year-old daughter, Bunny. Petal runs off with a lover, taking Bunny with her. Soon after, Petal and her boyfriend are killed in a car accident. The police return Bunny to Quoyle, informing him that Petal sold her to a black market adoption operation for $6,000.

Shortly before those events, Quoyle's elderly parents die by suicide together. Quoyle's aunt, Agnis Hamm, arrives to pay her respects to her late brother, though her real motive is to steal Guy's ashes (which she later dumps down an outhouse hole and urinates on). Agnis is moving to the ancestral family home in Newfoundland, which has been abandoned for 44 years. Agnis agrees to stay a few more days to help Quoyle through his recent turmoil, then persuades him to move to Newfoundland with her.

While struggling to build a new life, restore the derelict house, and care for Bunny, Quoyle meets Wavey Prowse, a widow whose young son, Harry, has a learning disability. Wavey and Quoyle gradually develop a deepening relationship. Wavey eventually admits she pretends to be widowed, ashamed that her philandering husband left when she was pregnant. Quoyle learns that the ancient Quoyles were pirates that ran ships aground and savagely pillaged them. When those Quoyles were driven out, they moved their house over a frozen lake to its present location, now known as Quoyle's Point. Quoyle's cousin Nolan, an old hermit, reveals that young Agnis was raped and impregnated by her teenaged brother (Quoyle's father), resulting in an abortion.

Quoyle applies for an ink setter job at the Gammy Bird. Owner and publisher, Jack Buggit, instead hires him as a reporter covering auto wrecks and the town's shipping news. With no journalism experience, Quoyle struggles to produce decent articles, incurring managing editor Tert Card's constant scorn. Reporter Billy Pretty tutors and encourages Quoyle. When Quoyle's article about a millionaire's vintage yacht docked in town is popular with readers, Jack assigns him a weekly column profiling an interesting boat in port. Meanwhile, Agnis resumes her former occupation as a boat upholsterer to help support the family. She later confides to Quoyle that the woman she loved died six years earlier from leukemia.
 
Rather than running his newspaper full time, Jack Buggit commercially fishes to prevent his adult son, Dennis, who nearly died at sea, from obtaining his own commercial license, which are limited. Jack drowns while securing his boat in an oncoming storm. During the funeral wake at the Buggit house, shock and chaos erupts when Jack miraculously revives from a coma-like state caused by hypothermia. Jack gives Dennis his fishing license, believing the generational curse of Buggits dying at sea has been broken. After Jack's revival, Bunny is upset and angry at Quoyle, believing Petal could also have been "awakened," but she finally accepts her mother's death.

Agnis, Quoyle, and Bunny have been living in town during the winter months while their house is renovated. On the night of the big storm, Bunny awakes and can "see" the house at Quoyle's point being blown away. When the family drives to their property, they discover the house is gone, symbolically freeing them from the dark Quoyle legacy.

Cast

 Kevin Spacey as Quoyle
 Julianne Moore as Wavey Prowse
 Judi Dench as Agnis Hamm
 Cate Blanchett as Petal
 Pete Postlethwaite as Tert Card
 Scott Glenn as Jack Buggit
 Rhys Ifans as Beaufield Nutbeem
 Gordon Pinsent as Billy Pretty
 Jason Behr as Dennis Buggit
 Larry Pine as Bayonet Melville
 Jeanetta Arnette as Silver Melville
 Katherine Moennig as Grace Moosup
 Marc Lawrence as Cousin Nolan
 John Dunsworth as Guy Quoyle

Production
The film, while broadly following the plot of the book, makes several changes; notably, Quoyle is obese and has two daughters in the novel, but in the film he has only one daughter and is of average build. He is only a timid ink setter in the film and he does not begin writing as a reporter until after he arrives in Newfoundland. In the novel, he is already a journalist. Another difference is that several characters, such as the younger Buggit family, are deleted or merged.

The film was originally to be directed by Fred Schepisi, with John Travolta in the lead male role.

Reception

Critical response
The Shipping News received mixed reviews from critics. Rotten Tomatoes gives the film a 55% rating, based on 130 reviews, with an average score of 5.8/10. The site's critical consensus reads, "Though solidly made and acted, The Shipping News is rather heavy-handed and dull, especially given the nature of its protagonist." At Metacritic, the film has a score of 47 out of 100, based on 31 critics, indicating "mixed or average reviews".

Accolades

Won
 Florida Film Critics Association:
 Best Supporting Actress (Cate Blanchett)
 National Board of Review:
 Best Supporting Actress (Cate Blanchett)

Nominated
 Art Directors Guild (ADG):
 Excellence in Production Design Award Feature Film – Contemporary Film
 BAFTA Awards:
 Best Actor in a Leading Role (Kevin Spacey)
 Best Actress in a Supporting Role (Judi Dench)
 Berlin International Film Festival:
 Golden Berlin Bear (Lasse Hallström)
 Broadcast Film Critics Association:
 Best Composer (Christopher Young)
 Best Film
 Golden Globe Awards:
 Best Actor – Motion Picture Drama (Kevin Spacey)
 Best Original Score (Christopher Young)
 Screen Actors Guilds (SAG):
 Outstanding Performance by a Female Actor in a Supporting Role (Judi Dench)
 USC Scripter Award:
 USC Scripter Award (Robert Nelson Jacobs and E. Annie Proulx)
 Young Artist Awards:
 Best Ensemble in a Feature Film

References

External links
 
 
 

2001 films
2001 drama films
American drama films
Films about journalists
Films based on American novels
Films directed by Lasse Hallström
Films produced by Irwin Winkler
Films scored by Christopher Young
Films set in Newfoundland and Labrador
Films shot in Newfoundland and Labrador
Films shot in Nova Scotia
Films with screenplays by Robert Nelson Jacobs
Miramax films
2000s English-language films
2000s American films